Meredith Ann Baxter (born June 21, 1947) is an American actress and producer. She is known for her roles on the CBS sitcom Bridget Loves Bernie (1972–73), ABC drama series Family (1976–80) and the NBC sitcom Family Ties (1982–89). A five-time Emmy Award nominee, one of her nominations was for playing the title role in the 1992 TV film A Woman Scorned: The Betty Broderick Story.

Early life 
Baxter was born in South Pasadena, California, the daughter of actress, director and producer Whitney Blake; and Tom Baxter, a radio announcer. After her parents were divorced in 1953, Baxter and her two brothers, Richard (born 1944) and Brian (born 1946), were raised by their mother in Pasadena. Her second stepfather was situation comedy writer Allan Manings. She and her Family Ties co-star, Michael Gross, were both born on June 21, 1947.

Baxter was educated at James Monroe High School before transferring to Hollywood High School. During her senior year, she attended Interlochen Center for the Arts as a voice major, but returned to Hollywood High, where she graduated in 1965.

Career

Early years 
Baxter got her first appearance in television in 1970 on an episode of The Partridge Family in its second season. She later appeared in 1972 as one of the stars of Bridget Loves Bernie, a CBS television network situation comedy. The series was canceled after one season. Her co-star, David Birney, became her second husband in 1974.  Until they were divorced in 1989, she was credited as "Meredith Baxter Birney", under which name she became widely known in 1976 on Family. She played the role of Nancy Lawrence Maitland and received two Emmy Award nominations for Outstanding Continuing Performance by a Supporting Actress in a Drama Series (1977 and 1978). In 1976 she played the wife of White House staffer Hugh W. Sloan Jr. in All the President's Men

1980s and 1990s 

After Family ended, she starred with Annette O'Toole and Shelley Hack in Vanities (1981), a television production of the comedy-drama stage play about the lives, loves and friendship of three Texas cheerleaders starting from high school to post-college graduation; it aired as a part of Standing Room Only, a series on the premium television channel HBO.

In 1982, Baxter landed the role of Elyse Keaton, the former flower child matriarch of the Keaton family on the NBC sitcom Family Ties. In 1986, during her time on Family Ties, Baxter garnered critical acclaim for her dramatic performance as Kate Stark in the NBC television film Kate's Secret, about a seemingly "perfect" suburban housewife and mother who is secretly suffering from bulimia nervosa. Following Family Ties, Baxter produced and starred in television films. She portrayed a psychopathic kidnapper in The Kissing Place (1990) and was nominated for an Emmy Award for Outstanding Lead Actress in a Miniseries or a Special for her work in A Woman Scorned: The Betty Broderick Story (1992), based on the true story of Betty Broderick, a divorcée who was convicted of murder in the shooting of her ex-husband and his young wife. For her work on the television film My Breast (1994), she received a special award for public awareness from the National Breast Cancer Coalition. In 1997, Baxter once again played the mother of a character played by Michael J. Fox (who portrayed her son, Alex P. Keaton, on Family Ties), this time in two episodes of Spin City.

Since 2000 
In 2005, she began appearing in television commercials for Garden State Life Insurance Company. In 2006, she temporarily co-hosted—with Matt Lauer—Today, the NBC morning news and talk show. In 2007, she made a guest appearance on What About Brian, an ABC drama series. That same year, she also made several appearances as the dying mother of Detective Lilly Rush on Cold Case, a CBS police procedural series. In recent years, Baxter created a skin care line called Meredith Baxter Simple Works, which raises funds for Baxter's breast cancer research foundation.

Baxter was the guest speaker at the 2008 Southern Commencement for National University in La Jolla, California, and was awarded an honorary doctoral degree from the university.

On March 1, 2011, Baxter's memoir, titled Untied, was published. In the book, she details her early life, her unhappy and in some cases abusive marriages, her struggles with and recovery from alcoholism, and her realization that she is a lesbian. The book became a New York Times bestseller.

She is also a spokesperson for the senior mobile service provider Consumer Cellular. She voiced the character "Elise Sr." in Dan Vs.. In April 2013, it was announced that Baxter would be in the season 4 finale episode of Glee, along with Patty Duke, as a mentor to Darren Criss's character Blaine Anderson and Chris Colfer's character, Kurt Hummel. She also made a guest appearance on the ABC Family/Freeform series Switched at Birth as the widowed mother of Kathryn Kennish (portrayed by Lea Thompson).

On August 4, 2014, producers announced that Baxter would be joining The Young and the Restless as Maureen, Nikki Newman's new drinking buddy, a "charming, intelligent, middle-class woman who has always aspired to a more privileged life than she has had". Baxter started appearing on the program on September 8. She also played the mother to "Stich" Raybourne and Kelly Andrews.

Personal life

Marriages and children 

Baxter has been married four times and has five children.

 Robert Lewis Bush (1966–1971, divorce); Children: Theodore Justin "Ted" Bush (born May 10, 1967) and Eva Whitney Bush (born August 6, 1969)
 David Birney (1974–1989, divorce); Children: Kathleen Jeanne "Kate" Birney (born December 5, 1974), and twins, Mollie Elizabeth Birney and Peter David Edwin Birney (born October 2, 1984)
 Michael Blodgett (1995–2000, divorce)
 Nancy Locke (2013–present)

On December 2, 2009, she came out as a lesbian during an interview with Matt Lauer on Today, and on the Frank DeCaro Show on Sirius-XM OutQ 102. Accepting her sexual orientation helped her understand why, in part, previous relationships with men had failed.

On March 1, 2011, while promoting a memoir, Baxter alleged that ex-husband David Birney had emotionally and physically abused her. Birney denied the allegations. ABC News reported that:

Meredith Baxter says in a new book, Untied, that she was a victim of emotional and physical abuse.

Baxter, the actress best known for playing hippie mom Elyse Keaton on the 1980s sitcom Family Ties, said that the abuser was her then-husband David Birney, who denied the allegations.

In her memoir, Baxter alleges that Birney hit her more than once. "It was so sudden and unexpected, I couldn't tell you which hand hit me, or even how hard," she writes. "I do recall thinking, 'I'd better not get up because he's going to hit me again.'"

She writes that she coped with the marital violence by drinking heavily, but has been sober since 1990 (the year after she and Birney divorced).

Regarding the fact that Baxter's marriage to Birney lasted throughout the entire seven seasons that she worked on Family Ties, ABC News reported,

Baxter said that her work helped her cope and she did not share her personal story with others.

"You learn to compartmentalize," she said on NBC. "When I got to the [television] studio, my home life was not happening. Nobody knew anything. I didn't have a social life. I did my work, I went home."

The day after Baxter discussed Birney on the Today Show, she traveled to Chicago to appear on The Oprah Winfrey Show for further discussion of the topics covered in her memoir. Winfrey's staff had arranged for Family Ties co-star Michael Gross to surprise Baxter on camera. Gross confirmed the assumption that Baxter had made throughout their seven years of working on the sitcom, that no one connected with the series had known or suspected that Baxter's husband was abusing her at the time. Gross was affectionate with Baxter on camera and expressed sorrow that she had endured such an ordeal for so long. Birney vehemently denied the claims that he had abused Baxter.

Health issues 
Baxter became a vegetarian because she wanted to.

Baxter was diagnosed with breast cancer in 1999. After treatment, she made a full recovery.

Filmography

Award nominations

Books

References

External links 

1947 births
20th-century American actresses
21st-century American actresses
21st-century American memoirists
21st-century American women writers
Actresses from Los Angeles
American film actresses
American lesbian actresses
American lesbian writers
American memoirists
American television actresses
American women memoirists
American women television producers
American voice actresses
Daytime Emmy Award winners
Hollywood High School alumni
Interlochen Center for the Arts alumni
Lesbian memoirists
LGBT people from California
LGBT television producers
Living people
People from Greater Los Angeles
Television producers from California
Writers from Los Angeles